George Franklin Verry (July 14, 1826 – October 5, 1883) was an American politician who served as the 17th Mayor of Worcester, Massachusetts, from 1872 to 1873.

George F. Verry was born on July 14, 1826, in Mendon, Massachusetts. In his childhood, Verry lived with his uncle, Samuel Verry, and his brother, Nathan T. Verry. He attended Phillips Academy in Andover, Massachusetts. When he was 23 years old, he began studying law in the office of Henry D. Stone and was admitted to the bar in 1851.

In 1872, Verry was elected Mayor of Worcester. He ran for re-election in 1873, but was defeated. He was a member of the State Senate in 1874 and 1875. In 1876, he was a delegate to the Democratic National Convention from Massachusetts.

Verry died on October 5, 1883, in Worcester and was buried in Rural Cemetery.

See also
 1874 Massachusetts legislature
 1875 Massachusetts legislature

References

1826 births
1883 deaths
Mayors of Worcester, Massachusetts
People from Mendon, Massachusetts
Phillips Academy alumni
Democratic Party Massachusetts state senators
19th-century American politicians